The following is a list of notable events and releases that happened in 2007 in music in South Korea.

Debuted and disbanded in 2007

Debuted groups

8eight
AnyBand
Baby Vox Re.V
Black Pearl
Bye Bye Sea
Daybreak
F.T. Island
Galaxy Express
Girls' Generation
Kara
Sultan of the Disco
Sunny Hill
Super Junior-T
Supernova
T-Max
Tritops
Winterplay
Wonder Girls

Solo debuts
 Andy
 Hwang Chi-yeul
 Elly
Hwangbo
 K.Will
 Min Hyo-rin
Innovator
Min Kyung-hoon
 Son Dam-Bi
 Zia

Disbanded groups
AnyBand
Black Beat
Girl Friends
 Lady

Reformed groups
Broken Valentine (formerly B.August)

Releases in 2007

First quarter

January

February

March

Second quarter

April

May

June

Third quarter

July

August

September

Fourth quarter

October

November

December

Deaths
U;Nee, 25, singer and actress

See also
2007 in South Korea
List of South Korean films of 2007

References

 
South Korean music
K-pop